Reimnitzia is a genus of lichenized fungi in the family Thelotremataceae. This is a monotypic genus, containing the single species Reimnitzia santensis.

The genus name of Reimnitzia is in honour of Christine Reimnitz (b.1956), the German-Australian wife of Michael Reimnitz (b.1943) a German-Australian, both were long-time friends of the author, Kalb. 

The genus was circumscribed by Klaus Kalb in Mycotaxon vol.79 on page 325 in 2001.

References

Ostropales
Lichen genera
Ostropales genera
Taxa named by Klaus Kalb
Taxa described in 2001